Pilar Carmelita Anastasia Arlando (born 1 September 1989 in Porto, Portugal) holds the title of Miss Singapore World for 2009–2010.

Biography
Arlando was raised in Singapore.

During the Miss Singapore World pageant, Arlando earned the 2nd Runner Up 2009/10 title, but took over from Ris Low, who had to resign the title.

Arlando went on to represent Singapore at the Miss World 2009 Pageant, held in Johannesburg, South Africa on 12 December 2009. She represented her nation as one of the top 12 for the Sports Fast Track Event.

Arlando has been part of various charity events, and is particularly active for children with Down syndrome.

References

External links
Her Determination
City-News-Singapore
Singapore-Contestant-MISSWORLD

1989 births
Living people
Miss World 2009 delegates
People from Porto
Singaporean people of Indian descent
Singaporean people of Portuguese descent
Singaporean people of Dutch descent
Singaporean people of Chinese descent
Singaporean beauty pageant winners